After Hours is the fourth studio album by Canadian singer the Weeknd, released on March 20, 2020, by XO and Republic Records. Primarily produced by the Weeknd, it features a variety of producers, including DaHeala, Illangelo, Max Martin, Metro Boomin, and OPN, most of whom the Weeknd had worked with previously. The standard edition of the album has no features, but the remixes edition contains guest appearances from Chromatics and Lil Uzi Vert. Thematically, After Hours explores loneliness, self-loathing, and escapism.

Prior to the album's release, the Weeknd confirmed that After Hours would contrast stylistically with its predecessor, Starboy (2016). Music journalists have noted the album as an artistic reinvention for the Weeknd, with the introduction of new wave and dream pop influences. The artwork and aesthetic for its promotional material has been described as psychedelic and being inspired by various films, such as Casino (1995), Fear and Loathing in Las Vegas (1998), Joker (2019), and Uncut Gems (2019), while its title is borrowed from the 1985 film of the same name directed by Martin Scorsese.

After Hours was supported by four singles: "Heartless", "Blinding Lights", "In Your Eyes", and "Save Your Tears", three of which reached number one on the Billboard Hot 100. The title track was released as a promotional single. In March 2020, After Hours broke the record for the most global pre-adds in Apple Music history, with over 1.02 million users. The album received generally positive reviews; some critics named it the Weeknd's best work. It debuted atop the Billboard 200, marking the Weeknd's fourth number-one album in the US, and stayed atop the chart for four consecutive weeks. After Hours also reached the top spot in 20 other countries, including his native Canada and the United Kingdom. As of December 2022, the album is certified triple platinum by the Recording Industry Association of America.

To support After Hours and his fifth studio album Dawn FM (2022), the Weeknd is currently embarking on the After Hours til Dawn Tour, which is set to span North and South America, Europe, Asia, Africa, the Middle East and Australia.

Background and release
The Weeknd first teased that he was working on a new album during a performance in November 2018, telling the crowd that "Chapter VI was coming soon". He continued to tease the project on January 12, 2019, by tweeting "no more daytime music". His post made fans and media outlets believe that he would continue the darker sounds that were present in his first EP My Dear Melancholy (2018). The Weeknd further teased the album on August 6, by tweeting "album mode full effect".

After a five-month period of silence, the Weeknd revealed a snippet of the album's second single "Blinding Lights" through a Mercedes-Benz commercial. The next day, he teased the album's lead single "Heartless", which was released on November 27, 2019; "Blinding Lights" was released two days later. In the hours leading up to the release of "Heartless", the Weeknd took to social media to tease the album's era, posting "the fall starts tomorrow night" and "Tonight we start a new brain melting psychotic chapter! Let's go!"

On February 13, 2020, the Weeknd revealed the album's title through a short teaser. On February 19, he revealed the album's artwork and release date, and released its title track as a promotional single. On March 17, the Weeknd unveiled After Hours tracklist. Hours before the album was released, the Weeknd announced that After Hours was dedicated to longtime fan Lance, the host of the XO Podcast who died the night before. On its release day, the album premiered on the eighth episode of the Weeknd's Apple Music 1 radio show Memento Mori. At the same time, the Weeknd hosted a listening session on Spotify.

Composition 
Musically, After Hours is a R&B, new wave and dream pop record that includes electropop and synth-pop influences. The album also contains elements of synthwave, electro, electro house, post-disco, trap, drum and bass, liquid funk, and synth-rock. Lyrically, After Hours explores themes of heartbreak, escapism, loneliness, promiscuity, overindulgence, self-loathing and regret.

When asked about the reason behind the album's title, the Weeknd explained to Variety: "Oh, there are so many reasons for it. The main reason is these are all emotions and thoughts and feelings that I had late at night – [like the video] is all one night and I’m going through all the emotions, after the club, after the fight and after a long day, it's like these are my thoughts from 3 a.m. to 5 a.m."

Artwork and aesthetic
The artwork and aesthetic for the album's promotional material has been described as psychedelic and being inspired by various films, such as: Fear and Loathing in Las Vegas (1998), Joker (2019), Casino (1995), and Uncut Gems (2019), with the last film having a cameo appearance by the Weeknd himself. The title of the album was inspired by the 1985 movie of the same name by Martin Scorsese. Tesfaye's physical appearance in the era has been described by journalists as being red-pigmented, with him consistently maintaining a red suit and specific hairstyle throughout all of the album's promotional material, such as its artwork, music videos, teasers, and live performances.

The album's overall art direction was primarily handled by the Tammi brothers, with its design being handled by Aleksi Tammi, and its photography and visual direction being handled by Anton Tammi, who directed the music videos for the album's singles, and the project's same-titled short film. The album's creative direction was handled by the Weeknd's creative director and childhood friend La Mar Taylor. Nabil Elderkin handled the photography and video direction for the promotional material of the deluxe version of the project, in this material, Tesfaye continues the era's "Sin City" theme, with him residing within a casino and donning a black suit in the two teasers for the bonus tracks.

The Target and HMV alternate cover of the album features the Weeknd against a black and red background, facing down to his right with a melancholic expression and bandaged face. The After Hours (Remixes) EP cover features the Weeknd against a black background, wearing a black suit with a silver tie, facing straight ahead of him while looking top right with black rimmed sunglasses depicting a thunderstorm in their reflection. The black suit used in the teasers for the deluxe edition of the album and cover art for the bonus tracks and remix EP was the first time the Weeknd wore a non-red suit in the promotional material for the project since his first live performance of "Blinding Lights" on The Late Show with Stephen Colbert (dated December 6, 2019), in which he donned a red suit.

Promotion

Singles
On November 27, 2019, the album's lead single, "Heartless", was released digitally on music stores and streaming services. The song was noticeably produced by American record producer Metro Boomin. At the time of its release, it was the Weeknd's first solo single since 2018's "Call Out My Name" from the EP My Dear Melancholy (2018). The single peaked at number one on the US Billboard Hot 100 and became the Weeknd's fourth song to top the chart, with it also becoming Metro Boomin's second chart topper that he produced. Its music video was released on December 3, 2019.

"Blinding Lights" was released digitally on music stores and streaming services on November 29, 2019, as the album's second single. The song peaked at number one in 22 countries, including the United States and Canada, where it became the Weeknd's fifth number-one single on the Billboard Hot 100 and the Canadian Hot 100 for four and seven weeks respectively. It also became his first number-one single in Germany for ten weeks, United Kingdom for eight weeks, and Australia for eleven weeks, thus making it his biggest hit single to date. Its music video is set in the aftermath of "Heartless"' visual and was released on January 21, 2020. It would later become the Billboard No. 1 Song of All Time in 2021.

"In Your Eyes" was released to rhythmic contemporary radio on March 24, 2020, as the album's third single. The song peaked at number 16 on the Billboard Hot 100. Its music video follows the storyline of the previously released visuals and was released on March 23, 2020.

"Save Your Tears" was released to contemporary hit radio in Europe as the album's fourth single on August 9, 2020. It was later released to US rhythmic contemporary radio on November 24, 2020. Following the remix with Ariana Grande, the song peaked at number one on the Billboard Hot 100. The music video for the song follows the storyline of the previously released visuals and was released on January 5, 2021.

Performances
On December 5, 2019, the Weeknd performed "Heartless" for the first time on The Late Show with Stephen Colbert with "Blinding Lights" receiving its debut performance the following day on the same show. Both performances received positive reactions from critics and audiences, and were compared to those done by Michael Jackson and Prince in the past. On January 22, 2020, "Blinding Lights" was performed on Jimmy Kimmel Live!. Tesfaye's appearance during the performance on the show was inspired by the events that occurred within the aforementioned single's music video, which was released shortly before his live performance. For his performance on the March 7, 2020, episode of Saturday Night Live, Tesfaye performed a comedic track alongside Kenan Thompson and Chris Redd, made specifically for the show, titled "On the Couch", and the songs: "Blinding Lights" and the previously unreleased "Scared to Live", the latter of which featured electronic musician Oneohtrix Point Never and interpolates "Your Song" by Elton John.

Throughout 2020, various other performances of the album's songs occurred during major televised events like the 2020 MTV Video Music Awards, the 2020 Time 100 primetime event, the American Music Awards of 2020.

Teaser and short film
On February 13, 2020, the Weeknd released a 48-second teaser that announced the album's title. Journalists noted its resemblance to the digital work done in the 2019 film Uncut Gems, which Tesfaye had a cameo in. Its visual were also compared to those found in the music videos for the album's first two singles.

A self titled short film for the album was first teased on March 3, 2020, with its release occurring on March 4, 2020. It was directed by Anton Tammi and continued the storyline and aesthetics found in the visuals for "Heartless" and "Blinding Lights". The film is set shortly after the Weeknd's performance of "Blinding Lights" on Jimmy Kimmel Live! (dated January 22, 2020) and features various snippets of the tracks from the album as Tesfaye navigates a subway. It concludes with the Weeknd seemingly murdering a couple in a secluded elevator. The visual was noted by journalists as being inspired by the films Joker and The Shining.

Promotional singles and other songs
On February 18, 2020, Tesfaye announced the release of the album's title track with the reveal of the album's cover art. The promotional single reached the top 20 of various countries worldwide, including the United States, where it peaked at number 20 on the Billboard Hot 100.

On April 7, 2020, a music video for the album's closing track "Until I Bleed Out" was released. The visuals for the song continue the themes found present throughout the promotional material for the album.

On July 22, 2020, a music video for the album's fifth track "Snowchild" was released. The animated visuals for the song continue the events of the previous After Hours music videos and also showcases the Weeknd during the six different musical stages of his career.

On October 22, 2020, a music video for the album's second track "Too Late" was released. The visual continues the storyline and themes established from the other music videos released in promotion of After Hours.

Tour

On February 20, 2020, the Weeknd announced the After Hours Tour, set to span North America and Europe. The tour would have originally lasted throughout the latter half of 2020, beginning on June 11 and ending on November 12. The tour was later postponed to 2021, then to 2022, due to the COVID-19 pandemic. Sabrina Claudio, Don Toliver and Black Atlass were set to open the tour.

On October 18, 2021, the Weeknd announced that due to arena constraints, the start of tour would be pushed back to the summer of 2022 and would now be held entirely in stadiums. He also announced that the tour would now be called the After Hours til Dawn Stadium Tour, as it also supports his fifth studio album Dawn FM (2022).

After Hours (Remixes)
A deluxe edition of the album, containing five remixes, was surprise released on March 23, 2020. An updated deluxe edition, containing three additional tracks, was released on March 30. A remix EP, featuring the deluxe edition's remixes and an additional remix, was released on April 3.

Super Bowl LV halftime show

On November 12, 2020, the Weeknd announced that he would be performing during the Super Bowl LV halftime show. The Weeknd contributed US$7 million to the halftime show, which lasted "roughly" 12–13 minutes, and took place on February 7, 2021. Dave Meyers executive produced the show, while Roc Nation produced and creatively directed. Hamish Hamilton, the event's annual director since 2010, returned to direct the performance. In contrast to past years, a stage within the stadium was built (as opposed to a stage on the field), to ensure the safety of workers and players. For the performance, he wore his signature red blazer and black necktie.

Virtual experiences
In August 2020, Tesfaye collaborated with social media platform TikTok to hold an interactive augmented reality live stream titled "The Weeknd Experience" on various dates, with the first occurring on August 7, 2020. The virtual concert featured several interactive components decided by popular vote, that would change the scenery of the livestream. 3D visuals featured in the livestream included back-up dancers that would appear with the Weeknd, who throughout the virtual experience would travel through hyperspace in a red convertible, surrounded by lasers in the virtual world.

Another virtual experience collaboration occurred with Spotify during August 2020 as well. This experience titled "Alone With Me", allowed users to interact with an AI based on the Weeknd in a highly personalized manner. In the experience, the Weeknd AI would discuss with the user their stats in regards to Tesfaye's music, and play their most listened to songs from After Hours while the interaction occurred.

Halloween Horror Nights haunted house
On July 26, 2022, it was announced that Tesfaye would collaborate with Universal Parks & Resorts on an After Hours-themed haunted house, titled The Weeknd: After Hours Nightmare, for that year's Halloween Horror Nights at Universal Studios Florida and Hollywood. The house is set to be based on and feature elements of the videos and short film from the album, and will be soundtracked by the songs  "After Hours", "In Your Eyes", "Heartless", "Blinding Lights", the solo version of "Save Your Tears", and "Too Late".

Critical reception 

After Hours was met with generally positive reviews from contemporary critics. At Metacritic, which assigns a normalized rating out of 100 to reviews from professional publications, the album received an average score of 80, based on 20 reviews, indicating "generally favorable reviews". Aggregator AnyDecentMusic? gave it 7.7 out of 10, based on their assessment of the critical consensus.

In a rave review, The New York Times journalist Jon Caramanica complimented After Hours for its "sparkled trauma, kaleidoscopic emotional confusion, urgent and panting physical release paired with failed-state romantic dyspepsia". Writing for Consequence, Candace McDuffie stated that as the Weeknd evolves, "he continues to reinvent himself, and he knows exactly how to leave fans hooked on havoc", and After Hours proves that he is "not done with us yet; in fact, he's just getting started". Exclaim! reviewer Jacob Carey stated that "After Hours does feel like the Weeknd's very own version of Vegas – a place where overindulgence, self-loathing and promiscuity are not only welcomed, but encouraged". The Guardians Michael Cragg praised the "sense of narrative cohesion" on the album, saying that its songs "bleed into each other", with the Weeknd exploring new sonic influences. He added that After Hours "feels like the first Weeknd album in a while to offer up a clear, singular vision rather than something frustratingly abstract". Writing for The Independent, Roisin O'Connor stated that the album eschews the danceability of its predecessor for "moody introspection", and called it "the music you listen to when the party's over". O'Connor further compared the album to the Weeknd's previous releases, saying that After Hours "still delves into a sadboy persona but there's a tinge of remorse that runs through, in comparison to the cold and often cruel tone of earlier cuts". Luke Morgan Britton of NME called it the Weeknd's "strongest record in some time", free of featured artists and "full of probing self-reflection".

Jon Dolan of Rolling Stone wrote that After Hours "has its share of pity-partying", but also displays vulnerability that "goes beyond the usual too-beautiful-for-the-world sulking". Dolan explained that the album strikes the best balance between the "gloomy melodrama" of the Weeknd's early EPs or his 2018 release My Dear Melancholy and the "pop slickness" of his 2016 album, Starboy, at once lachrymose and sleek, cold but plush, like a lavishly ornamented fallout shelter. Writing for Variety, Jem Aswad branded After Hours the "most fully realized album" of the Weeknd's career. He characterized the album's musical style as "ultra-cinematic keyboards, pulsating sub-bass, hard beats (which are seldom danceable), '80s synthesizer flourishes and caverns of echo, all of which contrast with his high, angelic voice". Aswad concluded that the album tests the balance "between innovation and commerciality as much as anyone today". In less favourable reviews, David Smyth of Evening Standard particularly praised the track "Blinding Lights", but found the Weeknd to be "in a bit of a fug" on the rest of After Hours. Tom Hull rated the album a B grade, finding it "remarkably consistent, at least until the closer drags its butt".

Year-end lists

Industry awards

Commercial performance
On March 19, 2020, After Hours broke the record for the most global pre-adds for an album in Apple Music history, with over 1.02 million users pre-adding the album to their libraries.

After Hours debuted at number one on the US Billboard 200 with 444,000 album-equivalent units, which included 275,000 pure album sales. It is the Weeknd's fourth number-one album, and marks the biggest first week sales of 2020 for an album at the time. Additionally, after the album's first week of availability, all 14 songs charted on the US Billboard Hot 100, with ten of them in the top 40, led by "Blinding Lights" at number one, and "In Your Eyes" debuting the highest, at number 16. The album remained at number one on the Billboard 200 in its second week with 138,000 album-equivalent units, of which 47,000 were pure album sales. It is the Weeknd's third consecutive album to top the chart for multiple weeks. In its third week, the album remained at number one on the Billboard 200 with 90,000 album-equivalent units (including 23,000 pure album sales). Becoming the first album to lead for three consecutive weeks since Post Malone's Hollywood's Bleeding (2019). In its fourth week, After Hours earned 75,000 album-equivalent units (including 20,000 pure album sales), remaining at number one on the Billboard 200 chart. It's the first album to notch four consecutive weeks since Drake's Scorpion (2018). After Hours was the fourth best selling album of 2020 with 2.032 million album-equivalent units, including 480,000 pure copies in the US. On December 6, 2022, After Hours was certified triple platinum by the Recording Industry Association of America (RIAA) for earning over three million album-equivalent units in the US.

The album debuted at number one on the UK Albums Chart with over 26,000 units sold, making it the Weeknd's second number one on the chart, five years after Beauty Behind the Madness. It also topped the Canadian Albums Chart of the Weeknd's home country, generating 54,000 album-equivalent units, which marked the biggest first-week album sales of the year. It achieved a total of six non-consecutive weeks atop the chart, the most by a Canadian artist since the Weeknd's own Starboy, which led the chart for seven weeks in 2016–2017.

Grammy controversy
The Weeknd did not receive any nominations for the 63rd Annual Grammy Awards on November 24, 2020, and Tesfaye responded by calling the Grammys "corrupt" in social media posts. Speculation arose over whether the announcement of his then-upcoming Super Bowl performance, as well as the confusion as to whether he should be nominated as pop or R&B, contributed to the snubs in all the categories he was submitted to by his team. Harvey Mason Jr., interim president of the Recording Academy, responded to the backlash by saying: 
 
The Weeknd later remarked in an interview with Billboard that the snub felt like "an attack", asserting: "Look, I personally don't care anymore. I have three GRAMMYs, which mean nothing to me now, obviously [...] It's not like, 'Oh, I want the GRAMMY!' It's just that this happened, and I'm down to get in front of the fire, as long as it never happens again. I suck at giving speeches anyways. Forget awards shows." Despite the Recording Academy announcing the elimination of private nominating committees, Tesfaye said that moving forward with his career, he will prevent his record label from submitting his work for Grammy consideration.

Track listing

Notes
  signifies a co-producer
  signifies an additional producer
  signifies an uncredited co-producer
 The deluxe edition of the album was initially released on March 23, featuring tracks 2–6 of the Remixes EP as bonus tracks. On March 30, the release was updated to include three new bonus tracks before the remixes. On April 3, the remixes were released as a separate EP, with track 1 added, while the deluxe edition of the album was amended to end at "Final Lullaby".
 "Save Your Tears" Remix with Ariana Grande was added to the deluxe edition of the album in March 2022.

Sample credits
 "Scared to Live" contains interpolations from "Your Song", written by Elton John and Bernard Taupin.

Personnel
Credits adapted from liner notes.

Musicians

 The Weeknd – vocals (all tracks), background vocalist (tracks 3–4, 9–11), keyboards, programming (tracks 1–11, 13–14), bass, guitar, drums (tracks 3–4, 9–11)
 Max Martin – bass, drums, guitar, keyboards, programming (tracks 3–4, 9–11)
 Oscar Holter – bass, drums, guitar, keyboards, programming (tracks 3–4, 9–11)
 Illangelo – keyboards, programming (tracks 1–2, 5–8, 13)
 Metro Boomin – keyboards, programming (track 6–8, 14)
 DaHeala – keyboards, programming (tracks 1–2, 5, 13)
 Frank Dukes – keyboards, programming (track 1)
 Ricky Reed – keyboards, programming (track 2)
 OPN – keyboards, programming (track 14)
 Prince 85 – keyboards, programming (track 14)
 Notinbed – keyboards, programming (track 14)
 Nate Mercereau – keyboards, programming (track 2)
 Mike McTaggart – guitar (track 6)
 Patrick Greenaway – guitar (track 8)
 Rickard Goransson – guitar (track 10)
 Michael Engström – bass (track 10)
 Wojtek Goral – alto saxophone (track 10)
 Tomas Jonsson – tenor saxophone (track 10)
 Mattias Bylund – horn arrangement, synthesizer (track 10)
 Nils-Petter Ankarblom – horn arrangement, synthesizer (track 10)
 Magnus Sjolander – percussion (track 10)
 Miko Rezler – percussion (track 10)
 Peter Noos Johansson – trombone (track 10)
 Janne Bjerger – trumpet (track 10)
 Magnus Johansson – trumpet (track 10)

Technical

 Illangelo – engineering, mixing (tracks 1–2, 5–8, 13)
 Shin Kamiyama – engineering (all tracks)
 Michael Ilbert – engineering (track 4, 10–11)
 Sam Holland – engineering (tracks 3–4, 10–11)
 Jason "DaHeala" Quenneville – engineering (track 13)
 Ethan Shumaker – engineering (track 2)
 Matt Cohn – engineering, mixing (tracks 12, 14)
 Şerban Ghenea – mixing (tracks 3–4, 9–11)
 John Hanes – engineering for mixing (tracks 3–4, 9–11)
 Cory Bice – engineering assistant (tracks 3–4, 9–11)
 Jeremy Lertola – engineering assistant (tracks 3–4, 9–11)
 Sean Klein – engineering assistant (track 9)
 Dave Kutch – mastering
 Kevin Peterson – mastering

Charts

Weekly charts

Year-end charts

Certifications

Release history

Footnotes

References

External links
 
 

2020 albums
Albums produced by Illangelo
Albums produced by Max Martin
Albums produced by Kevin Parker
Albums produced by Daniel Lopatin
Albums produced by Metro Boomin
Albums recorded at Noble Street Studios
Republic Records albums
The Weeknd albums
Concept albums
Juno Award for Album of the Year albums
Albums produced by the Weeknd
Dream pop albums by Canadian artists